{{Infobox person
| name =Fernando Napolitano
| image= FernandoNapolitano.jpg
|caption = Fernando Napolitano, President & CEO of NEWEST, formerly Italian Business & Investment Initiative
| birthname =Fernando Napolitano
|birth_date =
|birth_place =Naples, Italy
| death_date =
| death_place =
| education = University of Naples Federico IIPolytechnic Institute of New York UniversityHarvard Business School
| occupation =
| title = President & CEO NEWEST
| family =
| spouse =
| children =
| relatives =
| credits = Booz Allen Hamilton enterprise, former senior vice president and managing director (1990–2011)Innogest SGR, member of the international advisory board (since 2010) Enel, board of directors (from 2002 through 2014) BEST Program, chairman of the steering committee (since 2010) | URL =
}}

Fernando Napolitano (born September 15, 1964) is an Italian businessman and the president and CEO of the NEWEST formerly Italian Business & Investment Initiative (IB&II).

In 2010 in New York he founded IB&II, an independent organization that aims at facilitating investments between Italy and the United States and to provide, over time, educated information about Italy's opportunities for investments. In 2017, it evolved to include more European leaders.
Since 2013, he manages the yearly New York gathering "The International Exchange. Investing in Italy and a New Europe" (formerly "Italy Meets the United States of America") with the objective of providing leaders from Italy and Europe with a location to have a direct dialogue with US investors and opinion makers. In 2019 The Voice of Business was launched as the  only media company dedicated to original, candid, one-on-one English-language interviews with business and political leaders in Italy Europe. In 2020 IB&II evolved into NEWEST - Fostering a New EU-US business vision to bring more Europe to the US under Italy's auspices. In July 2021, Pimm Fox became Editor in Chief of The Voice of Business. Pimm joined Newest following 15 years with Bloomberg L.P., where he was the presenter of the daily program on Bloomberg Television called Taking Stock with Pimm Fox. He co-hosted Bloomberg Radio's financial and business afternoon show, Bloomberg Markets, with Carol Massar and Kathleen Hays. Pimm and his team covered breaking news, as well as conducted live in-studio and remote interviews with money managers, government representatives, central bank officials, regulators, lawmakers, CEOs, business leaders and Nobel economists among others

Biography
Businessman, former water polo National team player, interested in Italy's robust SME and start-up sector, Napolitano was born in Naples on September 15, 1964.
His father, Luigi Gerardo Napolitano(1928–1991) -- refer to Italy's Wikipedia https://it.wikipedia.org/wiki/Luigi_Gerardo_Napolitano--, was an engineer, scientist and professor, and former head of the Institute of Aerodynamics at the University of Naples. He was appointed as the inventor of the “MIcrogravity”.

As water-polo player he has been the captain of Circolo Canottieri Napoli team (Naples) and a member of the Italian national team Under 21, European Champions in 1984.

 NEWEST & The Italian Business & Investment Initiative and other roles 

In 2010 Napolitano founded in New York, where he moved with his family, the Italian Business & Investment Initiative, an independent organization to shed a new light on Italy's opportunities for investments.

He was an independent member of the board of directors of Mediaset S.p.A.(since 2015) and a member of the international advisory board of Innogest SGR S.p.A.venture capital fund.
He currently serves as chairman of the steering committee of BEST Program scholarship and member of the advisory board of Bologna Business School at University of Bologna.

 Career 

Napolitano served as senior vice president and managing director in Booz Allen Hamilton Italy (1990–2011 - Booz & Co from 2008), where he led the Organization and Strategy practice, specializing in the telecoms, media, aerospace and energy sectors. His previous professional experience includes marketing at Procter & Gamble Italia and Laben S.p.A.

 Previous appointment and membership 

2016-2017: Member of the Board of Directors of Albany Molecular Research Inc., AMRI NASDAQ;  2002-2014 Member of the Board of Directors of ENEL S.p.A.;  2002-2006 Member of the Board of Directors of the Italian Aerospace Research Center;  2001-2010: Member of Aspen Institute Italia;  2004-2010: Member of the Council on Foreign Relations, New York

Education

Napolitano graduated summa cum laude with a degree in economics from the University of Naples Federico II, holds a Master of Science Management from Brooklyn Polytechnic (now NYU-Poly), and graduated from Harvard Business School, Advanced Management Program.

The Italian Business & Investment Initiative

Under the leadership of Napolitano, the NEWEST formerly Italian Business & Investment Initiative has launched in 2015 a Board of Advisors in New York composed by distinguished US-based business leaders to support the growth and positioning of this initiative.
Napolitano has also launched in New York on February 11, 2013, the summit “Italy Meets the United States of America” evolved, in 2017, into "The International Business Exchange. Investing in Italy and a new Europe" whose objective is to facilitate a direct dialogue between European and Italian leadership and US investors and opinion makers.

Best Scholarship

Best Program  is a scholarship serviced by the Fulbright Commission in Italy promoted by US Embassy to Italy, Best Program Steering committee and Invitalia.
Napolitano serves as chairman of the steering committee of the BEST program.

The program targets Italian undergraduates, graduates and PhDs who have an innovative business idea deriving from their scientific research or experience. From 2014 the scholarship is also open to design & fashion scholars. Over the last 10 years, 87 Italians went through this scholarship and 37 high tech startups have been created in Italy.

Publications and other achievements

Napolitano is a columnist for Panorama magazine and Panorama - This is Italy web magazine.
In 2002, and later in 2007 he managed to organize at Harvard Business School for the very first time, two cases about Italian economy: “Italy: A New Commitment to Growth” by Richard H.K. Vietor and Rebecca Evans and “Italy: If not now, when?” by Richard H.K. Vietor and Julia Galef.

He is also the co-author of the book, “Megacommunities: How Leaders of Government, Business and Non-Profits Can Tackle Today’s Global Challenges Together”, published in 2008.
In 2010, he curated the biography of his father, Lo spazio, il quarto ambiente. Storia di Luigi Gerardo Napolitano, pioniere della microgravità di Giovanni Caprara'', published by IlSole24Ore Edizioni.

In 2014 Napolitano was awarded the One To World Fulbright Award for Cross-Cultural Leadership, in honor of his passion for building a bridge between the US and Italy.

Articles and interviews

Napolitano appearance on Italian and International media:

Il Giorno: Dec. 30, 2013 - http://italianbusiness.org/il-giorno-interview-on-options-to-make-expo-the-2015-place-to-go/ 
CLASS CNBC: Dec. 18, 2013 - http://italianbusiness.org/class-cnbc-fernando-napolitano-interview-12172013/ 
RAI: Oct. 15, 2013 - http://italianbusiness.org/fernando-napolitano-on-tgr-piazza-affari-15-oct-2013/
SKY TG 24: Oct. 15, 2013c - http://italianbusiness.org/fernando-napolitano-on-sky-tg24-pomeriggio-15-oct-2013/
Panorama: Sept. 26, 2013 - http://italianbusiness.org/destinazione-italia-f-napolitanos-view-panorma-9262013/
Panorama: Apr. 4, 2013 - http://economia.panorama.it/mondo/Start-up-in-Usa-Fernando-Napolitano-che-bell-idea-ti-trovo-i-dollari 
Panorama, Fernando Napolitano (Op-eds) - http://www.thisisitaly-panorama.com/topic/fernando-napolitano/ 
Corriere della Sera Jun. 13, 2013 - http://www.corriere.it/economia/13_giugno_18/usa-investitori-italia-startup-hi-tech_c770aefe-d821-11e2-98e6-97ca5b2e4e27.shtml 
Financial Times Sept. 2013 - http://italianbusiness.org/fernando-napolitano-financial-times-09-2013/ 
Il Sole 24 Ore Jun. 21, 2013 - http://italianbusiness.org/an-hi-tech-bridge-between-italy-and-the-u-s-il-sole-24-ore-21-jun-2013/ 
CNBC, Jan. 2013 - http://italianbusiness.org/napolitano-cnbc-interview-on-pope-feb-11-summit/ 
SKY TG 24 - Aug 14, 2013 - SKY Tg 24 Pomeriggio, Startapp
Bloomberg Television, Nov. 14, 2011 - https://www.bloomberg.com/video/80312668-new-italian-government-europe-stock-strategy.html

References

External links
 NEWEST Official Website
 BEST Program Official Website
 Panorama - This is Italy
 Mind the Bridge Foundation

Living people
1968 births
People from New York (state)
Italian male water polo players
Booz Allen Hamilton people
Italian chief executives
Polytechnic Institute of New York University alumni